Amélie Mauresmo was the defending champion, and successfully defended her title.

Seeds
The top four seeds receive a bye into the second round.

Draw

Finals

Top half

Bottom half

References

2004 Women's Singles
Advanta Championships - Singles
Sports in Philadelphia
Tennis in Pennsylvania